Ko-Yan is the second studio album from Malian artist Salif Keita. It was released in 1989 by Mango and produced by François Breant.

The album contains more influence from Western music, while still maintaining a traditional style. All the songs were written by Keita, including Nou Pas Bouger, one of his first hits.

Track listing
"Yada"
"Nou Pas Bouger"
"Ko-Yan"
"Fe-So"
"Primpin"
"Tenin"
"Sabou"

References

1989 albums
Mango Records albums
Salif Keita albums